Greg McMillan (born 11 July 1938) is an Australian former professional rugby league footballer who played for the South Sydney Rabbitohs.

McMillan, a winger from Lithgow, represented the NSW Country Firsts in 1962. He transferred to South Sydney during the 1962 NSWRFL season and played first-grade until 1965, during which time he was the club's goal-kicker.

Since the 1970s he has lived in the Albury–Wodonga region.

References

External links
Greg McMillan at Rugby League project

1938 births
Living people
Australian rugby league players
South Sydney Rabbitohs players
Country New South Wales rugby league team players
Rugby league wingers
Rugby league players from Lithgow, New South Wales